The 2012 FIFA U-17 Women's World Cup was the third edition of the women's football tournament, and was held in Azerbaijan from 22 September to 13 October, following a decision by the executive committee on 19 March 2010. Defending champions South Korea failed to qualify for the tournament. France won the title after defeating Korea DPR 1–1 (7–6 after pen.).

Mascot

The official mascot of this World Cup was The Top Top Girl (Top Top Qız), which means ball in Azerbaijani, a young girl with the national flag painted on her cheeks. Her body is blue, red, green and white kit like the host's national team and her brown hair in a ponytail designed to resemble what is known as a buta, a curving decorative motif widely used in Azerbaijani art.

Qualified teams

1.Teams that made their debut.

Venues
All four venues were initially to be staged only in Baku. 
There were also matches in Lankaran. Tofiq Bahramov Stadium was the stadium where the final was held.

Match officials
A total of 14 referees and 28 assistant referees were appointed by FIFA for the tournament.

Final draw
The final draw was held on 6 July 2012 in Baku.

Squads

Each team submitted a squad of 21 players, including three goalkeepers. The squads were announced on 14 September 2012.

Group stage
The ranking of each team in each group will be determined as follows:
 greatest number of points obtained in all group matches
 goal difference in all group matches
 greatest number of goals scored in all group matches
If two or more teams are equal on the basis of the above three criteria, their rankings will be determined as follows:
 greatest number of points obtained in the group matches between the teams concerned
 goal difference resulting from the group matches between the teams concerned
 greatest number of goals scored in all group matches between the teams concerned
 drawing of lots by the FIFA Organising Committee
The two teams finishing first and second in each group qualify for the quarter-finals.

All times are Azerbaijan Summer Time (UTC+5).

Group A

Group B

Group C

Group D

Knockout stage
In the knockout stages, if a match is level at the end of normal playing time, no extra time will be played, with the match to be determined by a penalty shoot-out.

Quarterfinals

Semifinals

Third place match

Final

Winners

Awards
The following awards were given for the tournament:

Goalscorers
8 goals
 Ri Un-sim

6 goals
 Chinwendu Ihezuo

4 goals

 Lea Declercq
 Kadidiatou Diani
 Jane Ayieyam
 Halimatu Ayinde

3 goals

 Sara Däbritz
 Rebecca Knaak
 Priscilla Okyere
 Yui Narumiya
 Kim So-hyang
 Ri Kyong-hyang

2 goals

 Byanca
 Zhang Chen
 Dayana Castillo
 Pauline Cousin
 Ricarda Kießling
 Yui Hasegawa
 Ayaka Inoue
 Rika Masuya
 Akari Shiraki
 Hina Sugita
 Ri Hyang-sim
 Tessy Biahwo
 Summer Green
 Yamila Badell

1 goal

 Andressa
 Brena
 Camila
 Summer Clarke
 Amandine Pierre-Louis
 Nichelle Prince
 Valerie Sanderson
 Lyu Yueyun
 Miao Siwen
 Tang Jiali
 Laura Aguirre
 Gabriela Maldonado
 Candice Gherbi 
 Griedge Mbock Bathy
 Penda Bah 
 Sainey Sissohore
 Sharon Beck
 Vivien Beil
 Pauline Bremer
 Alberta Ahialey
 Fatima Alhassan 
 Sherifatu Sumaila
 Yuka Momiki
 Mizuki Nakamura
 Risa Shimizu
 Rin Sumida
 Emily Jensen 
 Martine Puketapu 
 Choe Yun-gyong
 Kim Phyong-hwa 
 Fernanda Pérez
 Joy Bokiri
 Aminat Yakubu
 Darian Jenkins 
 Amber Munerlyn
 Toni Payne
 Morgan Stanton

1 Own goal
 Ana Clara (playing against New Zealand)
 Diana Duarte (playing against Nigeria)
 Mariama Bojang (playing against France)
 Amie Jarju (playing against United States)
 Metta Sanneh (playing against France)

References

External links
FIFA U-17 Women's World Cup Azerbaijan 2012 , FIFA.com
FIFA Technical Report

FIFA
2012
2012 in Azerbaijani sport
2012
Woo
2012 in youth sport
September 2012 sports events in Asia
October 2012 sports events in Asia
2012 in youth association football